The House of Secrets is a 1926 mystery thriller novel by the British writer Sydney Horler. Horler was a prolific writer known for particularly for his series featuring Tiger Standish, but he also wrote many stand-alone novels. In 1927 he adapted the novel into a stage play of the same name.

Film Adaptations
In 1929 it was made into an American film of the same title starring Joseph Striker. It was adapted a second time in 1936 as House of Secrets directed by Roland D. Reed and starring Leslie Fenton and Muriel Evans. Both the original and remake were made by the Hollywood-based Poverty Row studio Chesterfield Pictures.

References

Bibliography
 Goble, Alan. The Complete Index to Literary Sources in Film. Walter de Gruyter, 1999.
 Reilly, John M. Twentieth Century Crime & Mystery Writers. Springer, 2015.

External links
 

1926 British novels
British thriller novels
British mystery novels
Novels set in England
British novels adapted into films
Novels by Sydney Horler
Hodder & Stoughton books